Cryodraco pappenheimi is a bathydemersal species of marine ray-finned fish belonging to the family Channichthyidae, the crocodile icefishes. It occurs in the Southern Ocean.

The status of C. pappenheimi as a Cryodraco species is unclear. The holotype was deposited in the Natural History Museum, Berlin and has been lost. From descriptions of this taxon, it is possible that it does not belong in the genus Cryodraco.

References 

Cryodraco
Fish of the Southern Ocean
Fish described in 1913
Taxa named by Charles Tate Regan